Peter Kristian Ahola (born May 14, 1968) is a Finnish former professional ice hockey player who played in the National Hockey League for the Los Angeles Kings, Pittsburgh Penguins, Calgary Flames, and the San Jose Sharks.

Playing career
In his rookie year in Los Angeles, Ahola led the Kings in +/- with a +12 in the 1991–92 NHL season. He also scored 7 goals and 12 assists for 19 points in 71 games. He was then traded to Pittsburgh for Jeff Chychrun during the next season. In Pittsburgh, he played 22 games and didn't register a goal and only scored one assist. Ahola was then traded a second time in that season to the San Jose Sharks. The Sharks traded him to the Tampa Bay Lightning on June 19, 1993 for Jack Capuano, but then was traded to the Calgary Flames for cash on October 5, 1993. This was his fourth trade in eleven months. He only played two games on the Flames before he got sent down to the minor league team, the Saint John Flames. 

In total, Ahola played 123 regular season games, scoring 10 goals and 17 assists for 27 points and collecting 137 penalty minutes. He also played six playoff games during his rookie season with the Kings but didn't register a point. Ahola went back to Finland's SM-liiga in 1994 and then to Sweden's Elitserien in 2001 before retiring in 2003.

Personal
Ahola is a formerly top-rated water-skier in his homeland of Finland. He currently serves as a European scout for the Vegas Golden Knights of the NHL, serving in the role since the  season.

Career statistics

Awards and honors

Transactions
On April 5, 1991 the Los Angeles Kings signed free agent Peter Ahola.
On November 6, 1992 the Los Angeles Kings traded Peter Ahola to the Pittsburgh Penguins in exchange for Jeff Chychrun.
On February 26, 1993 the Pittsburgh Penguins traded Peter Ahola to the San Jose Sharks in exchange for future considerations.
On June 19, 1993 the San Jose Sharks traded Peter Ahola to the Tampa Bay Lightning in exchange for Dave Capuano.
On October 5, 1993 the Tampa Bay Lightning traded Peter Ahola to the Calgary Flames in exchange for cash.

References

External links

1968 births
Living people
AHCA Division I men's ice hockey All-Americans
Boston University Terriers men's ice hockey players
Calgary Flames players
Cleveland Lumberjacks players
Espoo Blues players
Finnish expatriate ice hockey players in Sweden
Finnish expatriate ice hockey players in the United States
Finnish expatriate ice hockey players in Canada
Finnish ice hockey defencemen
HIFK (ice hockey) players
Los Angeles Kings players
Phoenix Roadrunners (IHL) players
Pittsburgh Penguins players
Saint John Flames players
San Jose Sharks players
Södertälje SK players
Sportspeople from Espoo
Toronto Maple Leafs scouts
HC TPS players
Undrafted National Hockey League players
Vegas Golden Knights scouts